Fernand Forgues (1884–1973) was a French rower and rugby union player.

1884 births
1973 deaths
Biarritz Olympique players
French male rowers
French rugby union coaches
French rugby union players
Sportspeople from Pyrénées-Atlantiques
France international rugby union players